Progress M-25 was a Russian unmanned Progress cargo spacecraft, which was launched in November 1994 to resupply the Mir space station.

Launch
Progress M-25 launched on 11 November 1994 from the Baikonur Cosmodrome in Kazakhstan. It used a Soyuz-U rocket.

Docking
Progress M-25 docked with the aft port of the Kvant-1 module of Mir on 13 November 1994 at 09:04:29 UTC, and was undocked on 16 February 1995 at 13:03:00 UTC.

Decay
It remained in orbit until 16 February 1995, when it was deorbited. The deorbit burn occurred at 16:06:00 UTC and the mission ended at 16:45 UTC.

See also

 1994 in spaceflight
 List of Progress missions
 List of uncrewed spaceflights to Mir

References

Progress (spacecraft) missions
1994 in Kazakhstan
Spacecraft launched in 1994
Spacecraft which reentered in 1995
Spacecraft launched by Soyuz-U rockets